19-2 may refer to:
 19-2 (2011 TV series), a French-language series
 19-2 (2014 TV series), an English-language series

See also
 192 (disambiguation)